Madeeha bint Ahmed bin Nassir al Shibaniyah is an Omani politician. She is the Government Minister of Education.

Biography 
Madeeha bint Ahmed bin Nassir al Shibaniyah graduated from the University of California, Santa Barbara with a PhD in Education. She is the chairperson of the Omani National Commission for Education, Culture, and Science. She is the Minister of Education in Oman. In 2017 the Forbes Middle East placed her seven on a list of most powerful Arab women in government. She was appointed the Minister of Education in 2011 by Sultan Qaboos bin Said. She was third woman in the history of Oman to hold a cabinet position in government. She replaced Yahya bin Saud Al Sulaimi, the previous Minister of Education. In 2014 she visited Japan on an official visit. She hosted and sponsored the Second Gulf Forum on Nanotechnology in Oman. She is the chairperson of the Supervisory Committee of the Specialised Centre for Professional Training of Teachers in Oman. In 2016 she inaugurated the library of the centre and also over the overhaul of its websites and social media pages.

References

Year of birth missing (living people)
Living people
Education ministers of Oman
21st-century Omani women politicians
21st-century Omani politicians
Women government ministers of Oman
University of California, Berkeley alumni